Ricardo Gabriel Priori (born 8 December 1995) is an Argentine professional footballer who plays as a midfielder for Defensores Unidos.

Career
Defensores Unidos gave Priori his start in senior football. The club won promotion from Primera C Metropolitana in the 2017–18 campaign, after he had appeared sixty-two times and scored once for them since 2016. He made his Primera B Metropolitana debut versus San Telmo on 2 September 2018. In the succeeding February, Priori was sent off on two occasions; in fixtures with Estudiantes and Fénix.

Career statistics
.

Honours
Defensores Unidos
Primera C Metropolitana: 2017–18

References

External links

1995 births
Living people
Place of birth missing (living people)
Argentine footballers
Association football midfielders
Primera C Metropolitana players
Primera B Metropolitana players
Defensores Unidos footballers